Giovanni Stefano Danedi (1608 or 1612–1690) was an Italian painter of the Baroque period. he is also known as Stefano Montalti.

Biography
He was born at Treviglio, and was the brother of Gioseffo Danedi, also a painter called il Montalto and also a pupil of the painter Pier Francesco Mazzucchelli (il Morazzone) while in Milan. In Milan, he contributed to the decoration of Santa Maria della Grazie and the Church of the Carmine. Also painted frescoes (1648) in the presbytery of the Cathedral of Monza. Danedi also painted a series of frescoes (1656) for the Villa Frisiani Mereghetti in Corbeto and (1671-788) for two chapels on the right of the church of the Certosa di Pavia. He also painted for the Sanctuary at the Sacro Monte of Varallo. He died in Milan.

References

Popsoarte entry
 Domenico Sedini, Giovanni Stefano Danedi, online catalogue Artgate by Fondazione Cariplo, 2010, CC BY-SA.

Specific

Other projects

1612 births
1690 deaths
People from Treviglio
17th-century Italian painters
Italian male painters
Painters from Milan
Italian Renaissance painters
Italian Baroque painters
Fresco painters